Lucy Filippini (13 January 1672 – 25 March 1732) is venerated as a Catholic saint. She founded the Institute of the Maestre Pie, dedicated to the education of young girls.

Life 

Lucy Filippini was born on 13 January 1672 in Corneto-Tarquinia. She was the fifth and youngest child of Filippo Filippini and Maddalena Picchi.  She was orphaned at an early age. At the age of six, she went to live with her aristocratic aunt and uncle who encouraged her religious inclination by entrusting her education to the Benedictine nuns at Santa Lucia.

Her career began under the patronage of Cardinal Marcantonio Barbarigo, who entrusted her with the work of founding schools for young women, especially the poor. With Rose Venerini to train school teachers, she co-founded with Marcantonio Barbarigo the Pious Teachers (Religious Teachers Filippini), a group dedicated to the education of girls. The young ladies of Montefiascone were taught domestic arts, weaving, embroidering, reading, and Christian doctrine. Twelve years later the Cardinal devised a set of rules to guide Lucy and her followers in the religious life. Fifty-two schools were established during Lucy's lifetime. Pope Clement XI, in 1707, called Lucy to Rome to start schools which he placed under his special protection. She died of breast cancer in 1732, aged 60, at Montefiascone.

Veneration
Lucy Filippini was canonized 22 June 1930. Her statue can be seen in the first upper niche from the main entrance on the left (south) side of the nave of St. Peter's Basilica.  Her feast day is 25 March.

See also
 Religious Teachers Filippini

References

External links

 Profile, catholic.org; accessed 31 October 2014.
Founder Statue in St Peter's Basilica

Italian Roman Catholic saints
1672 births
1732 deaths
18th-century Christian saints
Incorrupt saints
Deaths from breast cancer
Deaths from cancer in Lazio
Christian female saints of the Early Modern era